Homens? ( Men?) is a Brazilian comedy television series that premiered on Comedy Central in Brazil on March 18, 2019. After the television debut, each episode was made available on the Amazon Prime Video service.

Premise
The series follows Gustavo (Gabriel Godoy), Pedrinho (Raphael Logam), Pedro (Gabriel Louchard) and Alexandre (Fábio Porchat), four longtime friends who feel lost as the contemporary world reinvents and women are empowered. They understand that they were created in a sexist way and want to modify their behavior, but they find it difficult in the middle of the process.

Cast
 Gabriel Godoy	as Gustavo
 Raphael Logam	as Pedrinho
 Gabriel Louchard	as Pedro
 Fábio Porchat as	Alexandre
 Rafael Portugal
 Lorena Comparato
 Gisela Fróes
 Giselle Itié
 Miá Mello
 Cintia Rosa
 Giselle Batista as Natasha
 Maytê Piragibe as Rachel

References

2019 Brazilian television series debuts
2010s Brazilian television series
Brazilian comedy television series
Portuguese-language television shows